Aghcheh Mashhad (also Romanized as Āghcheh Mashhad; also known as Pasīānlū, Āghcheh Mashhad-e Pasānlū, and Āghcheh Mashhad-e Pasātlū) is a village in Sarajuy-ye Jonubi Rural District, Saraju District, Maragheh County, East Azerbaijan Province, Iran. At the 2006 census, its population was 75, in 17 families.

References 

Towns and villages in Maragheh County